Andrew Richard Mullins (born 1964) is an English former rugby union player. Mullins represented Harlequin FC and won a single cap for England in 1989.

Early life
Andy Mullins was born on 12 December 1964 in Eltham. He was educated at Dulwich College and Durham University, where he was a member of Hatfield College. He spent a year between school and university in the British Army.

Rugby union career
Mullins was selected for England B against Australia in 1988, part of the latter teams European tour. He made his international debut on 4 November 1989 at Twickenham in the England vs Fiji match. He was on the winning side.

References

1964 births
Living people
Alumni of Hatfield College, Durham
Durham University RFC players
England international rugby union players
English rugby union players
People educated at Dulwich College
Rugby union players from Greenwich
Rugby union props